KAFM (88.1 FM) is a radio station located in Grand Junction, Colorado, United States.

History
Grand Valley Public Radio Company (GVPRC) incorporated on June 22, 1992. The first board of directors included Mickey Krakowski, Martin Krakowski, Marilyn Jones, Greg Jouflas, Char Shoffner, Elizabeth Thompson and Peter Trosclair. On April 12, 1994, the FCC granted a license to GVPRC for 88.1 at 16 watts and assigned call letters KAFM.

In mid 1995  KAFM filed an application with the FCC to transmit at 46,000 watts at 100.7, asking FCC to allow KAFM to swap frequencies as per published FCC rules.  In January, 1996 the FCC denied KAFM's request but decided to open up 100.7 for operation.  In mid 1996 KAFM and twelve other broadcast companies, including Colorado Public Radio and almost every Grand Junction commercial broadcaster, applied for 100.7, leading the FCC to freeze the process while it determined how to proceed.  In 1997 KAFM negotiated with KCIC, 88.5 to move to 88.7 which would allow both stations to raise power levels but in 1998 the existence of the CPR station in Montrose, KPRH, precluded deal with KCIC and KAFM was stuck at 16 watts.  In mid 1998 the FCC told all 100.7 applicants to decide who would get the 100.7 frequency or the FCC would auction off the frequency to the highest bidder and put the funds into the FCC budget.  In a unique situation, the twelve 100.7 applicants agreed to hold a private auction and split the funds among the losing bidders; bidding to increase in $5,000 increments.  The auction resulted in a price of $440,000 for the 100.7 license.  KAFM received 1/11th of the proceeds, after expenses, amounting to approximately $40,000

In mid-1998 the KAFM board decided to put 88.1 at 16 watts on air, not knowing if many would be able to hear the station or would support it.  Transmitter site facilities on Black Ridge were constructed in 1998 and the original studio facilities on West Independent were constructed in 1999.  KAFM went on the air March 5, 1999.

In November, 2001  KAFM moved to 1310 Ute Avenue, purchasing building after their landlord decided to triple rent on existing studios.
In 2004 KAFM received funding to build 'Studio D,' a volunteer-run recording and sound studio for the 'Radio Room', an 80-person concert hall in the new building at 1310 Ute Ave.  KAFM began monthly Radio Room concerts, highlighting local musicians and national acts.

See also
List of community radio stations in the United States

External links

AFM
Community radio stations in the United States
Radio stations established in 1992